Barow may refer to:

Bārow, a variant name of Vala Rud, a village in Zanjan County, Zanjan Province, Iran
John Barow or Barrow, a number of people
Margaret à Barow or Barrow, (1500–1560/69), an English lady, known for her learning, sometimes referred to as Margaret Aborough (a variant of à Barow / Barrow)

See also
Thomas Barowe or Barrow (died 1497?), English ecclesiastic and judge
Luserina Barows, a character in role-playing video game Suikoden V
Roger Barows (foaled 2016), a Japanese Thoroughbred racehorse
Barrow (disambiguation)